Thomas Jerome Hudner Jr. (August 31, 1924 – November 13, 2017) was a United States Navy officer and naval aviator. He rose to the rank of captain, and received the Medal of Honor for his actions in trying to save the life of his wingman, Ensign Jesse L. Brown, during the Battle of Chosin Reservoir in the Korean War.

Born in Fall River, Massachusetts, Hudner attended Phillips Academy in Andover, Massachusetts and the United States Naval Academy. Initially uninterested in aviation, he eventually took up flying and joined Fighter Squadron 32, flying the F4U Corsair at the outbreak of the Korean War. Arriving near Korea in October 1950, he flew support missions from the aircraft carrier .

On 4 December 1950, Hudner and Brown were among a group of pilots on patrol near the Chosin Reservoir when Brown's Corsair was struck by ground fire from Chinese troops and crashed. In an attempt to save Brown from his burning aircraft, Hudner intentionally crash-landed his own aircraft on a snowy mountain in freezing temperatures to help Brown. In spite of these efforts, Brown died of his injuries and Hudner was forced to leave Brown's body behind, as a rescue helicopter could not fly in the dark and Hudner had suffered his own injuries in the landing.

Following the incident, Hudner held positions aboard several U.S. Navy ships and with a number of aviation units, including a brief stint as executive officer of  during a tour in the Vietnam War, before retiring in 1973. In subsequent years, he worked for various veterans' organizations in the United States. The  guided missile destroyer  is named for him.

Early life and education 
Hudner was born 31 August 1924 in Fall River, Massachusetts. His father, Thomas Hudner Sr., was a businessman of Irish descent who ran a chain of grocery stores, Hudner's Markets. Three brothers were later born, named James, Richard, and Phillip.

Hudner entered the prestigious Phillips Academy in Andover, Massachusetts, in 1939. His family had a long history in the academy, with his father graduating in 1911 and his uncle, Harold Hudner, graduating in 1921. Eventually, the three younger Hudner children would attend the academy as well; James in 1944, Richard in 1946 and Phillip in 1954. During his time in the high school, Thomas was active in several organizations, serving as a team captain in the school track team as well as a member of the football and lacrosse teams, a class officer, a member of student council, and an assistant house counselor.

Career 
Following the attack on Pearl Harbor and the United States' entry into World War II, Hudner heard a speech by academy headmaster Claude Fuess which he later said inspired him to join the military. One of 10 from Phillips to be accepted into the academy from his class, he entered the United States Naval Academy in Annapolis, Maryland, in 1943 and graduated in 1946. By the time he was commissioned, however, World War II had ended. Hudner attended the Naval Academy with a number of other notable classmates, including Marvin J. Becker, James B. Stockdale, Jimmy Carter, and Stansfield Turner. He played football at the academy, eventually becoming a starting running back for the junior varsity team.

After graduation, Hudner served as a communications officer aboard several surface ships. During his initial years in the military, Hudner said he had no interest in aircraft. After a one-year tour of duty aboard the Baltimore-class heavy cruiser , which was operating off the coast of Taiwan, he transferred to a post as a communications officer at the Naval Base Pearl Harbor where he served for another year. By 1948, Hudner became interested in aviation, and applied to flight school, seeing it as "a new challenge". He was accepted into Naval Air Station Pensacola in Pensacola, Florida, where he completed basic flight training, and was transferred to Naval Air Station Corpus Christi in Texas, where he completed advanced flight training and qualified as a naval aviator in August 1949. After a brief posting in Lebanon, Hudner was assigned to VF-32 aboard the aircraft carrier USS Leyte, piloting the F4U Corsair. He later said he enjoyed this assignment, as he considered the Corsair to be "safe and comfortable".

Korean War 

On the night of 25 June 1950, ten divisions of the North Korean People's Army launched a full-scale invasion of the nation's neighbor to the south, the Republic of Korea. The force of 89,000 men moved in six columns, catching the Republic of Korea Army by surprise, resulting in a rout. The smaller South Korean army suffered from widespread lack of organization and equipment, and was unprepared for war. The numerically superior North Korean forces destroyed isolated resistance from the 38,000 South Korean soldiers on the front before it began moving steadily south. Most of South Korea's forces retreated in the face of the invasion. The North Koreans were well on their way to South Korea's capital of Seoul within hours, forcing the government and its shattered army to retreat further south.

To prevent South Korea's collapse the United Nations Security Council voted to send military forces. The United States' Seventh Fleet dispatched Task Force 77, led by the fleet carrier , and the British Far East Fleet dispatched several ships, including , to provide air and naval support. Although the navies blockaded North Korea and launched aircraft to delay the North Korean forces these efforts alone did not stop the North Korean Army juggernaut on its southern advance. U.S. President Harry S. Truman later ordered ground troops into the country to supplement the air support. All U.S. Navy units and ships including Leyte were placed on alert. The ship was in the Mediterranean Sea, and Hudner did not expect to be deployed to Korea, but on 8August a relief carrier arrived in the area and Leyte was ordered to Korea. Naval commanders felt the pilots on Leyte were better trained and prepared than those of other available carriers, so they were among the first dispatched to the theater. Leyte sailed from the Strait of Gibraltar across the Atlantic Ocean and to Quonset, then through the Panama Canal and to San Diego, California, Hawaii, and Japan before arriving in the waters off Korea around 8October.

The ship joined Task Force 77 off the northeast coast of the Korean Peninsula, part of a fleet of 17 ships from the U.S. Seventh Fleet, including the aircraft carrier , battleship , and cruiser . Hudner flew 20 missions in the country. These missions included attacks on communication lines, troop concentrations, and military installations around Wonsan, Chongpu, Songjim, and Senanju.

Following the entrance of the People's Republic of China into the war in late November 1950, Hudner and his squadron were dispatched to the Chosin Reservoir, where an intense campaign was being fought between X Corps (United States) and the People's Volunteer Army’s 9th Army. Almost 100,000 Chinese troops had surrounded 15,000 U.S. troops, and the pilots on Leyte were flying dozens of close air support missions every day to prevent the Chinese from overrunning the area.

Medal of Honor action 

On 4 December 1950, Hudner was part of a six-aircraft flight supporting U.S. Marine Corps ground troops who were trapped by Chinese forces. At 13:38, he took off from Leyte with squadron executive officer Lieutenant Commander Dick Cevoli, Lieutenant George Hudson, Lieutenant Junior Grade Bill Koenig, Ensign Ralph E. McQueen, and the first African American Naval Aviator,  Ensign Jesse L. Brown, who was Hudner's wingman. The flight traveled  from Task Force 77's location to the Chosin Reservoir, flying 35 to 40 minutes through very harsh wintery weather to the vicinity of the villages Yudam-ni and Hagaru-ri. The three-hour search and destroy mission was also an attempt to probe Chinese troop strength in the area.

Though the flight spotted no Chinese, at 14:40 Koenig radioed to Brown that he appeared to be trailing fuel. The damage had likely come by small arms fire from Chinese infantry, who were known to hide in the snow and ambush passing aircraft by firing in unison. At least one bullet had ruptured a fuel line. Brown, losing fuel pressure and increasingly unable to control the aircraft, dropped his external fuel tanks and rockets and attempted to land the craft in a snow-covered clearing on the side of a mountain. The aircraft broke up violently upon impact and was destroyed. In the crash, Brown's leg was pinned beneath the fuselage of the Corsair, and he stripped off his helmet and gloves in an attempt to free himself, before waving to the other pilots, who were circling close overhead. Hudner and the other airborne pilots thought Brown had died in the crash, and they immediately began a mayday radio to any heavy transport aircraft in the area as they canvassed the mountain for any sign of nearby Chinese ground forces. They received a signal that a rescue helicopter would come as soon as possible, but Brown's aircraft was smoking and a fire had started near its internal fuel tanks.

Hudner attempted in vain to rescue Brown via radio instruction, before intentionally crash-landing his aircraft, running to Brown's side and attempting to wrestle him free from the wreck. With Brown's condition worsening by the minute, Hudner attempted to drown the aircraft fire in snow and pull Brown from the aircraft, all in vain. Brown began slipping in and out of consciousness, but in spite of being in great pain, did not complain to Hudner. A rescue helicopter arrived around 15:00, and Hudner and its pilot, Lieutenant Charles Ward, were unable to put out the engine fire with a fire extinguisher. They tried in vain to free Brown with an axe for 45 minutes. They briefly considered, at Brown's request, amputating his trapped leg. Brown lost consciousness for the last time shortly thereafter. His last known words, which he told Hudner, were "tell Daisy I love her." The helicopter, which was unable to operate in the darkness, was forced to leave at nightfall with Hudner, leaving Brown behind. Brown is believed to have died shortly thereafter of his injuries and exposure to the extreme cold. No Chinese forces threatened the site, likely because of the heavy air presence of the VF-32 pilots.

Hudner begged superiors to allow him to return to the wreck to help extract Brown, but he was not allowed, as other officers feared an ambush of the vulnerable helicopters resulting in additional casualties. In order to prevent the body and the aircraft from falling into Chinese or North Korean hands, the U.S. Navy bombed the crash site with napalm two days later; the aircrew recited the Lord's Prayer over the radio as they watched flames consume Brown's body. The pilots observed that his body looked to have been disturbed and his clothes stolen, but he was still stuck in the aircraft. The remains of both Brown and the aircraft were never recovered. Brown was the first African American U.S. Navy officer killed in the war.

The 4 December incident grounded Hudner for a month, as he injured his back in the landing, an injury he later said persisted for 6to 8years. He flew 27 combat missions during the war, serving there until 20 January 1951, when Leyte was rotated back to the Atlantic Fleet. On 13 April 1951, Hudner received the Medal of Honor from President Harry S. Truman, meeting Brown's widow, Daisy Brown, in the process. The two stayed in regular contact for at least 50 years following this meeting. He was the first service member to receive the medal during the Korean War, though several others would receive the medal for actions which occurred before 4December 1950.

Hudner said he was occasionally criticized for his actions, and that "about 90" people had told him he acted recklessly. His commanders noted his actions may have endangered the helicopter pilot and sacrificed an aircraft, criticisms Hudner later said did not make him regret his decision, as he felt it was a spur-of-the-moment action. Still, commanders later issued orders forbidding pilots from crash-landing in a similar way to try to save downed wingmen. On later reflection, Hudner indicated he did not consider himself a hero for his actions.

Later Navy career 

After receiving the Medal of Honor, Hudner was transferred to the United States and served as a flight instructor at Naval Air Station Corpus Christi in Texas in 1952 and 1953. Following this, he served as a staff officer for Carrier Division 3, which at the time was part of Task Force 77 and operating around Japan, in 1953 and 1954. In 1955 and 1956, he served in Air Development Squadron 3 at Naval Air Station Atlantic City in New Jersey, where he flew developmental and experimental aircraft. During this time, he was trained on jet engine-powered aircraft.

Beginning in October 1957, Hudner served in an exchange program with the U.S. Air Force, flying for two years with the 60th Fighter-Interceptor Squadron at Otis Air Force Base in Barnstable County, Massachusetts. During this assignment, he flew the F-94 Starfire and the F-101 Voodoo. He was then promoted to commander and served as aide to the Chief of the Bureau of Naval Weapons until 1962, when he attended the Air War College at Maxwell Air Force Base in Montgomery, Alabama. Upon graduating in July 1963, he returned to flying duty and was appointed the executive officer of Fighter Squadron 53, flying the F-8E Crusader aboard . After serving as executive officer, Hudner assumed command of VF-53. Following this assignment, he was transferred to a position as Leadership Training Officer at the office of Commander, Naval Air Forces, at Naval Air Station North Island in Coronado, California.

Hudner was promoted to captain in 1965, taking command of Training Squadron 24 at Naval Air Station Chase Field in Bee County, Texas, which he commanded in 1965 and 1966. Kitty Hawk deployed off the shore of South Vietnam in 1966 and 1967, launching missions in support of the Vietnam War, and he served on the ship during this tour but saw no combat and flew none of the missions himself. In 1968, he was assigned as the operations officer for the Southeast Asia Air Operations division of the U.S. Navy. That year, he married Georgea Smith, a widow with three children, whom he had met in San Diego. The two had one son together, Thomas Jerome Hudner III, born in 1971. Hudner's final Navy posting was as the head of Aviation Technical Training in the Office of the Chief of Naval Operations in Washington, D.C., a post which he held until his retirement in February 1973.

Present at the commissioning ceremony in Boston, Massachusetts, were Daisy Brown Thorne, who had remarried, her daughter Pamela Brown, and Hudner, who gave a dedication. The ship was decommissioned on 27 July 1994 and sold to Egypt.

Later life and death

After retiring, Hudner initially worked as a management consultant, and later worked with the United Service Organizations. Because of his Medal of Honor, he worked regularly with various veterans groups in his retirement as a leader in the veterans' community, otherwise living a quiet life. From 1991 to 1999, he served as Commissioner for the Massachusetts Department of Veterans' Services, until he gave up that position to Thomas G. Kelley, another Medal of Honor recipient.

He received a number of honors in his later life. In 1989, he was honored by the Gathering of Eagles Program of the Air Force at Maxwell Air Force Base. In 2001, Hudner presented Daisy Brown Thorne with several of Jesse Brown's posthumous medals at Mississippi State University. In May 2012, the Secretary of the Navy announced that an  guided missile destroyer would be named . The ship was christened on April 1, 2017, with Hudner in attendance, and commissioned in Boston on 1 December 2018.

After 1991, Hudner lived in Concord, Massachusetts, with his wife, Georgea. In July 2013, he visited Pyongyang, North Korea, in an attempt to recover Jesse Brown's remains from the crash site. He was told by North Korean authorities to return in September when the weather would be more predictable.

Hudner's official biography—Devotion: An Epic Story of Heroism, Friendship, and Sacrifice—was released in October 2015, after seven years of collaboration with author Adam Makos.

Hudner died at his home in Concord, Massachusetts, on November 13, 2017, at the age of 93. He was interred at Arlington National Cemetery on April 4, 2018, in a ceremony attended by General Joseph Dunford, Chairman of the Joint Chiefs of Staff.

Hudner is portrayed in the 2022 film Devotion by Glen Powell.

Awards and decorations

Medal of Honor citation 

Hudner was one of 11 men awarded the Medal of Honor during the Battle of Chosin Reservoir. He was the first of seven U.S. Navy servicemen, and the only Naval aviator, to be awarded the Medal of Honor in the Korean War.

In film and literature
 Film: Devotion (2022)
 Book: Devotion: An Epic Story of Heroism, Friendship, and Sacrifice (2015)

See also 

 List of Korean War Medal of Honor recipients

Citations

Notes

References

Sources 

 

 
 
 
 
 
 
 
 
 
 
 
 

Online sources

Further reading

External links 

 
 Historic footage of Thomas Hudner receiving Medal of Honor from President Harry Truman.
 Interview at the Pritzker Military Museum & Library
 Arlington National Cemetery

1924 births
2017 deaths
United States Navy personnel of the Korean War
American Korean War pilots
United States Navy personnel of the Vietnam War
Burials at Arlington National Cemetery
Korean War recipients of the Medal of Honor
United States Navy Medal of Honor recipients
People from Fall River, Massachusetts
People from Concord, Massachusetts
Military personnel from Massachusetts
Phillips Academy alumni
Recipients of the Air Medal
Recipients of the Legion of Merit
United States Naval Academy alumni
United States Naval Aviators